Novy Port (lit. New Port) is a settlement in Yamalo-Nenets Autonomous Okrug, Russia, located on the mouth of the Ob River.  Population: 1,797.

Along with Dikson, it is the main port on the Kara Sea.  Its main industry is a fish factory.

In the 1930s, Novy Port was an interim coal bunkering port for providing power to vessels traversing the Northern Sea Route.

The Northern Sea Route is so long that the Soviets tried to power each leg of the voyage by locally mined coal.  The coal bunkered at Novy Port was, at that time, mined from other Soviet Arctic ports.

Climate
Novy Port has a severe subarctic climate (Köppen climate classification Dfc). The weather (even in the warmest month, July) is notoriously unpleasant. Winter lasts eight months, and precipitation is low throughout a year.

References

Rural localities in Yamalo-Nenets Autonomous Okrug
Populated places of Arctic Russia